This is a list of now defunct airlines of the United Arab Emirates.

See also
 List of airlines of the United Arab Emirates
 List of airports in the United Arab Emirates

References

United Arab Emirates
Airlines
Airlines, defunct